Fazl Mosque may refer to:

Fazl Mosque, London
Fazl Mosque, Washington, D.C.